Store Tverråtinden is a mountain in Lom Municipality in Innlandet county, Norway. The mountain is surrounded by several other notable mountains including Storjuvtinden and Svellnosbreahesten to the north; Sauhøi to the west; Bukkehøe, Lindbergtinden, and Bukkeholstindene to the southwest; Store Styggehøe and Bukkeholshøe to the southeast; and Midtre Tverråtinden to the east.

See also
List of mountains of Norway by height

References

Jotunheimen
Lom, Norway
Mountains of Innlandet